War depictions in film and television include documentaries, TV mini-series, and drama serials depicting aspects of historical wars, the films included here are films set in the Ancient world starting with Ancient Egypt and lasting until the fall of Western Roman Empire in about AD 476. 

Note: All wars are BC unless other wise noted.

War of Ancient Egypt (3050 BC –332 BC) 

 The Loves of Pharaoh (1922)
 Sudan (1945)
 The Egyptian (1954)
 Land of the Pharaohs (1955)
 The Pharaohs' Woman (1960)
 Nefertiti, Queen of the Nile (1961)
 Pharaoh (1966)
 Nefertiti, figlia del sole (1994)
 The Scorpion King (2002)
 Tut (2015)

War of Ancient Israel (1600–400 BC) 

 Esther (1916)
 The Queen of Sheba (1921)
 Salome (1923)
 The Ten Commandments (1923)
 Judith and Holofernes (1929)
 David and Bathsheba (1951)
 The Queen of Sheba (1952)
 Slaves of Babylon (1953)
 The Ten Commandments (1956)
 Solomon and Sheba (1959)
 Judith and Holofernes (1959)
 Esther and the King (1960)
 Moses the Lawgiver (1974)
 The Story of David (1976)
 King David (1985)
 Moses (1995)
 Solomon & Sheba (1995)
 One Night with the King (2006)
 The Ten Commandments (2007)
 The Book of Esther (2013)
 Exodus: Gods and Kings (2014)

Trojan War (1193–1183 BC) 

 The Fall of Troy (1911)
 Helena (1924)
 The Private Life of Helen of Troy (1927)
 Helen of Troy (1956)
 The Trojan Horse (1961)
 L'ira di Achille (1962)
 The Trojan Women (1971)
 Iphigenia (1977)
 Helen of Troy (2003)
 Troy (2004)
 Troy: Fall of a City (2018)，TV series

Wars of Ancient China (771 BC–280 AD)

Spring and Autumn period (771-476 BC) 

 The Great Revival (2007)
 Confucius (2010)

Warring States period (476–221 BC) 

 Qu Yuan (1977)
 The Emperor's Shadow (1996)
 The Emperor and the Assassin (1999)
 Hero (2002)
 A Battle of Wits (2006)
 Wheat (2009)
 Sacrifice (2010)
 Little Big Soldier (2010)
 The Warring States (2011)

Chu–Han Contention (206–202 BC) 
 The Great Conqueror's Concubine (1994)
 White Vengeance (2011)
 The Last Supper (2012)
 Legend of Chu and Han (2012)

Han–Xiongnu War (133 BC–89 AD) 
 Mulan (1998), animated film
 Mulan (2009)
 The Rise of King Modu (2013)
 Mulan (2020), live-action remake of 1998 animated film

Wars of the Three Kingdoms (220–280 AD) 

 Diao Chan (1938)
 Diao Chan (1958)
 Diao Chan yu Lu Bu (1967)
 Red Cliff (2008)
 Three Kingdoms: Resurrection of the Dragon (2008)
 Three Kingdoms (2010)
 The Lost Bladesman (2011)
 The Assassins (2012)

Scythian campaign of Cyrus The Great (530 BC) 
 Tomiris (2019)

Greco-Persian Wars (499–450 BC) 

 La battaglia di Maratona (1959)
 The 300 Spartans (1962)
 300 (2006) Battle of Thermopylae, Battle of Plataea
 Last Stand of the 300 (2007) TV documentary/reenactment which premièred on The History Channel
 300: Rise of an Empire (2014) Battle of Plataea, Battle of Marathon, Battle of Artemisium, Battle of Salamis

Wars of Alexander the Great (338–325 BC) 
 Sikandar (1941)
 Alexander the Great (1956)
 Goliath e la schiava ribelle (1963)
 Alexander (2004), depictions of the Battles of Gaugamela and Hydaspes
 Young Alexander the Great (2010)

Wars of the Diadochi (322–275 BC) 
 Il Colosso di Rodi (1961)

Asoka the Great's conquests (ca. 304–232 BC) 
 Asoka (2001)
 Chakravartin Ashoka Samrat

Wars of the Roman Kingdom/Republic/Empire 
 The First King: Birth of an Empire (2019)
 Brennus, Enemy of Rome (1963), the first Gallic invasion of Italy
 Rome (TV series) (2005/2007)
 Augustine: The Decline of the Roman Empire (2010) TV miniseries about St Augustine set during the Vandal invasion
 Dragon Blade (2015)

Punic Wars (264–146 BC) 
 Cabiria (1914)
 Scipio Africanus: The Defeat of Hannibal (1937)
 Annibale (1960), the Second Punic War
 Carthage in Flames (1960), the Third Punic War
 Siege of Syracuse (1960)
 Hannibal (2006), TV depiction of the Second Punic War

Servile Wars (135–75 BC) 
 Sins of Rome (1953)
 Spartacus (1960), the Third Servile War
 The Slave (1962)
 Spartacus and the Ten Gladiators (1964)
 Spartacus (2004)
 Spartacus (2010)

Roman civil wars during the Late Republic (133–31 BC) 

 Cleopatra (1917)
 Cleopatra (1934)
 Caesar and Cleopatra (1945)
 Julius Caesar (1950)
 Julius Caesar (1953)
 Serpent of the Nile (1953)
 Legions of the Nile (1959)
 Cleopatra (1963)
 Julius Caesar (1970)
 Antony and Cleopatra (1972)
 Antony and Cleopatra (1974)
 Antony and Cleopatra (1981)
 Cleopatra (1999)
 Rome (2005)

Roman campaigns in Germania (12 BC - AD 16) (12 BC – 16 AD) 
 Barbarians (2020) - TV series

Jewish–Roman wars (63 BC – 135 AD) 

 Ben-Hur (1925)
 Salome (1953)
 Ben Hur (1959)
 King of Kings (1961)
 Masada (1981)
 Ben Hur (2016)
 Risen (2016)

Gallic Wars (58–50 BC) 
 Slave of Rome (1961)
 Caesar the Conqueror (1962)
 Giants of Rome (1964)
 Asterix animated films based on the comic book character and the Gallic Wars
 Druids (a.k.a. Vercingétorix) (2001)

War of Roman Britain (43–410) 
 Boudica (2003), fictionalized story of Boudicca, Queen of the Iceni of Britain and the revolt against Roman occupation.
 Centurion (2010), Roman ninth Legion in 2nd century Britain
 The Eagle (2011), Roman centurion in 2nd century Britain
 Britannia (2018)

Dacian Wars (86–106) 
 Dacii (1967), the Domitian's Dacian War
 The Column (1968), the Trajan's Dacian Wars

Marcomannic Wars (167–180) 
 The Fall of the Roman Empire (1964), the Marcomannic Wars
 Gladiator (2000), the Marcomannic Wars

Roman civil wars during the Late Empire (306–398) 
 Constantine and the Cross (1961), chronicle of emperor Constantine's life including the famous Battle of the Milvian Bridge
 Decline of an Empire (2014)

War with the Huns (395–453) 
 Attila (1954), European campaign of Attila the Hun
 Sign of the Pagan (1954)
 Attila flagello di Dio (1982)
 Attila (2001), TV miniseries of the European campaign of Attila the Hun

Fall of the Western Roman Empire (455–476) 
 The Last Legion (2007)

Anglo-Saxon settlement of Britain (410–600) 
 King Arthur (2004), depiction of the Battle of Mons Badonicus
 The Last Legion (2007)
 Pendragon: Sword of His Father (2008) (direct-to-video)

See also 
List of war films and TV specials

References 

Phoenicia in fiction
Ancient Greece in fiction
Ancient Egypt in fiction
Ancient Rome in art and culture
Israel in fiction
China in fiction
Trojan War films